Brandon Ebel is the founder, president and CEO of Tooth & Nail Records.  He founded the label in 1993 in California, United States.  The label has since grown to include sub-labels BEC Recordings, Solid State Records and Uprok Records.  Ebel has contributed to  hundreds of releases the label has put out.

Personal life 
Brandon was born in Dallas, Texas and attended Oregon State University, graduating in 1992 with Bachelor of Science in Broadcasting. Brandon was a member of Sigma Phi Epsilon. After receiving his degree, he started Tooth & Nail Records in his bedroom with a small loan. He now resides in Seattle, Washington.

References 

American Christians
Living people
Oregon State University alumni
American music industry executives
Year of birth missing (living people)